Joseph Norman Roddom (16 May 1924 – 1988) is an English former footballer who played as a wing half in the Football League for Darlington.

Roddom played professionally for North Eastern League club Blyth Spartans in the early part of the 1947–48 season, while serving in the Royal Air Force. He joined Second Division club Chesterfield in January 1948 in exchange for £500 and the forward John Allison. He played for Chesterfield's reserves in the Central League, but never for the first team. Despite being placed on their retained list in 1950, he was transferred to Darlington in June 1950. He made six Third Division North appearances for Darlington, then moved on to South Shields, where he played until at least the 1954–55 season.

Notes

References

1924 births
1988 deaths
People from Spennymoor
Footballers from County Durham
English footballers
Association football wing halves
Blyth Spartans A.F.C. players
Chesterfield F.C. players
Darlington F.C. players
South Shields F.C. (1936) players
English Football League players
20th-century Royal Air Force personnel